Ashinia Miller (born 6 June 1993 in Kingston) is a Jamaican shot putter. He was studied at University of Georgia, United States between 2013-2016. He represented Jamaica at the 2018 Commonwealth Games.

Career
He won a gold medal in the shot put at the 2011 Pan American Junior Athletics Championships, and the 2012 Central American and Caribbean Junior Championships.

His personal bests stand at  indoor and  outdoor.

Personal best

Achievements

References

External links
 
 Georgia Bulldogs bio

1993 births
Living people
Sportspeople from Kingston, Jamaica
Jamaican male shot putters
Athletes (track and field) at the 2010 Summer Youth Olympics
Georgia Bulldogs track and field athletes
Athletes (track and field) at the 2018 Commonwealth Games
Commonwealth Games competitors for Jamaica
Competitors at the 2018 Central American and Caribbean Games
Central American and Caribbean Games silver medalists for Jamaica
Athletes (track and field) at the 2019 Pan American Games
Pan American Games competitors for Jamaica
Central American and Caribbean Games medalists in athletics